The White Umfolozi River originates just west of Vryheid, KwaZulu-Natal, South Africa and has a confluence with the Black Umfolozi River at  to form the Umfolozi River, which flows eastward towards the Indian Ocean.

See also 
 List of rivers of South Africa
 List of dams in South Africa
 List of drainage basins of South Africa
 Water Management Areas

References

Rivers of KwaZulu-Natal
Umfolozi River